Dubrowsky is a 1959  Italian - Yugoslav historical drama film  directed by William Dieterle. It is based on the posthumously published 1841 novel Dubrovsky by Alexander Pushkin.

Plot 
Russia in 1831: two families, the Dubrowskys and the Petrovichs, have been at loggerheads with each other ever since the nouveau riche Kirila Petrovich once deprived old Dubrowsky of large parts of his property. Dubrowsky's son Vladimir, called Wladja, does not want to submit to this fraud and fights for his rights with all means, especially since he accuses Petrovich of being complicit in his father's death. Eventually he puts himself at the head of other betrayed, especially peasants, who have also been harmed, and the generally disenfranchised.

The young Dubrowsky has to realize how much the people are starving and suffering under the bondage of serfdom and sets himself up as the avenger of the dispossessed by taking it from the rich and giving it to the poor, in the tradition of Robin Hood. In the fight against Petrovich's reign of terror of money, Vladja's love intervenes one day, because the beautiful Masha is, of all people, the daughter of his worst adversary, the landowner Kirila.

Cast 
John Forsythe as Vladja Dubrowski
Rosanna Schiaffino as Masha Petrovieh
Paul Dahlke as Kirila Petrovich
William Dieterle as Kirila Petrowitsch
Nerio Bernardi as Governor Fürst Werejski
Guido Celano as Gerichtsvorsitzender
Giulio Donnini as Patnutic
Johanna Hofer as Maria Jegorowna
Bata Živojinović as Russian soldier

References

External links

1959 films
1950s adventure drama films
Yugoslav adventure drama films
Italian adventure drama films
West German films
1950s Italian-language films
1950s English-language films
English-language Italian films
English-language Yugoslav films
Films directed by William Dieterle
Films based on works by Aleksandr Pushkin
Films based on Russian novels
Films scored by Carlo Rustichelli
Films set in the 19th century
Films set in Russia
Remakes of Italian films
1959 drama films
1950s Italian films